Molière Award for Best Actor. Winners and nominees.

1980s 

1987 : Philippe Clévenot in Elvire Jouvet 40
 Michel Bouquet in The Imaginary Invalid (Le Malade imaginaire)
 Jacques Dufilho in Staircase (L'Escalier)
 Claude Rich in Let Us Do a Dream (Faisons un rêve)
 Michel Serrault in The Miser (L'Avare)
1988 : Jacques Dufilho in Je ne suis pas Rappaport
 Daniel Auteuil in La Double Inconstance
 Michel Bouquet in The Imaginary Invalid (Le Malade Imaginaire)
 Patrick Chesnais in A Day in the Death of Joe Egg (Joe Egg)
 Roman Polanski in The Metamorphosis (La Métamorphose)
 1989 : Gérard Desarthe in Hamlet
 Sami Frey in Je me souviens
 Bernard Freyd in Le Faiseur de Théâtre
 Fabrice Luchini in Journey to the End of the Night (Voyage au bout de la nuit)
 Laurent Terzieff in Henry IV (Henri IV)

1990s 

 1990 : Pierre Dux in Quelque part dans cette vie
 Robert Hirsch in Moi Feuerbach
 Francis Huster in The Plague (La Peste)
 Claude Rich in Le Souper
 Didier Sandre in The Lonely Way (Le Chemin solitaire)
 1991 : Guy Tréjean in Heldenplatz
 Daniel Auteuil in Les Fourberies de Scapin
 Jean-Claude Dreyfus in La Nonna
 Didier Sandre in The Break of Noon (Partage de midi)
 Jacques Villeret in Double Bass (La Contrebasse)
 Lambert Wilson in Eurydice
 1992 : Henri Virlogeux in L'Antichambre
 Gérard Desarthe in Célimène et le Cardinal
 Stéphane Freiss in C'était bien
 Marcel Maréchal in Mr Puntila and his Man Matti (Maître Puntila et son valet Matti)
 Lambert Wilson in Ruy Blas
 1993 : Michel Aumont in Macbeth
 Bernard Giraudeau in The Little Black Book (L'Aide-mémoire)
 Robert Hirsch in Une folie
 Michel Serrault in Knock
 Laurent Terzieff in Temps contre temps
 1994 : Jean-Pierre Marielle in The Homecoming (Le Retour)
 Gérard Desarthe in La Volupté de l'honneur
 Thierry Fortineau in The Visitor  (Le Visiteur)
 Maurice Garrel in The Visitor  (Le Visiteur)
 Jean-Luc Moreau in Comment va le monde, Môssieu ? Il tourne, Môssieu !
 Jacques Villeret in Le Dîner de Cons  (Le Dîner de cons)
 1995 : Pierre Meyrand in Business is business (Les Affaires sont les affaires)
 Pierre Arditi in « Art »
 Didier Galas in Ahmed le subtil ou Scapin 84
 Fabrice Luchini in « Art »
 Pierre Vaneck in « Art »
 1996 : Didier Sandre in An Ideal Husband  (Un mari idéal)
 Michel Aumont in Décadence
 Michel Duchaussoy in Le Refuge
 André Dussollier in Scènes de la vie conjugale
 Jean Piat dans L'Affrontement
 1997 : Pierre Cassignard in The Venetian Twins (Les Jumeaux vénitiens)
 Jean-François Balmer in Le Faiseur
 Bernard Giraudeau in The Libertine  (Le Libertin)
 Francis Huster in Enigma Variations  (Variations énigmatiques)
 Robin Renucci in François Truffaut, correspondance
 1998 : Michel Bouquet dans Les Côtelettes
 Patrick Chesnais in Skylight
 Jean-Claude Dreyfus in The Hygiene of the Assassin  (Hygiène de l'assassin)
 Patrick Préjean in Cyrano de Bergerac
 Philippe Torreton in Les Fourberies de Scapin
 1999 : Robert Hirsch in London Assurance  (Le Bel Air de Londres)
 Pierre Arditi in Rêver peut-être
 Niels Arestrup in Copenhagen  (Copenhague)
 Roland Blanche in Tedy
 Sami Frey in Pour un oui ou pour un non

2000s 

 2000 : Michel Aumont in Un sujet de Roman
 Michel Bouquet in À torts et à raisons
 Claude Brasseur in À torts et à raisons
 Jacques Gamblin in Raisons de famille
 Jean-Jacques Moreau in Accidental Death of an Anarchist (Mort accidentelle d'un anarchiste)
 2001 : Simon Abkarian in Beast on the Moon (Une bête sur la lune)
 Michel Aumont in Le grand retour de Boris S.
 Jean-François Balmer in Novecento
 Bernard Giraudeau in Becket or The Honor of God  (Becket ou l'Honneur de Dieu)
 Jacques Villeret in Jeffrey Bernard est souffrant
 2002 : Jean-Paul Roussillon in Le Jardin des apparences
 Pierre Arditi in The School for Wives (L'École des femmes)
 Philippe Clay in Visites à Mister Green
 André Dussollier in Monstres sacrés, sacrés monstres
 Samuel Labarthe in The Shop Around the Corner (La boutique au coin de la rue)
 2003 : Thierry Fortineau in Gros-Câlin
 André Dussollier in Monstres sacrés, sacrés monstres
 Robert Hirsch in Memoir (Sarah)
 Gérard Jugnot in État critique
 Claude Rich in Les Braises
 2004 : Dominique Pinon in L'Hiver sous la table
 Sami Frey in Je me souviens
 Éric Métayer in Des cailloux plein les poches
 Christian Pereira in Des cailloux plein les poches
 Francis Perrin in Signé Dumas
 2005 : Michel Bouquet in Exit the King (Le Roi se meurt)
 Pierre Cassignard in The Mistress of the Inn (La Locandiera)
 Éric Elmosnino in Peer Gynt
 Stéphane Freiss in Brooklyn Boy
 Alain Libolt in The Browning Version  (La Version de Browning)
 Pierre Vaneck in Ritter, Dene, Voss (Déjeuner chez Wittgenstein)
2006 : Jacques Sereys in Du coté de chez Proust
 Niels Arestrup in Letters to a Young Poet  (Lettres à un jeune poète)
 Michel Piccoli in King Lear (Le Roi Lear)
 Claude Rich in Le Caïman
 Philippe Torreton in Richard III
 Jean-Louis Trintignant in Moins 2
 2007 : Robert Hirsch in The Caretaker (Le Gardien)
 Michel Bouquet in The Miser (L'Avare)
 Jacques Gamblin in Confidences trop intimes
 Michel Piccoli in King Lear (Le Roi Lear)
 Michel Vuillermoz in Cyrano de Bergerac
 2008 : Michel Galabru in  Les Chaussettes - opus 124
 Clovis Cornillac in Hotel Paradiso (L'Hôtel du libre échange)
 Jacques Frantz in Les riches reprennent confiance
 Jérôme Kircher in La Petite Catherine de Heilbronn
 2009 : Patrick Chesnais in Cochons d'Inde
 Jacques Bonnaffé in L'Oral et Hardi
 Claude Duparfait in Tartuffe
 Samuel Labarthe in Très chère Mathilde
 Claude Rich in Le Diable rouge
 Wladimir Yordanoff in Coriolanus (Coriolan)

2010s 

2010 : Laurent Terzieff in The Dresser (L'Habilleur) and Philoctetes  (Philoctète)
 Jean-Quentin Châtelain in Ode maritime
 Jean-Claude Dreyfus in Le Mardi à Monoprix
 Robert Hirsch in The Loving Maid (La Serva amorosa)
 Daniel Russo in Les Autres
  2011 : Christian Hecq in A Fly in the Ointment (Un fil à la patte)
 Niels Arestrup in Diplomatie
 Jean-François Balmer in Henri IV, le bien aimé
 Jean-Claude Dreyfus in Le Mardi à Monoprix
 André Dussollier in Diplomatie
 Micha Lescot in The Chairs (Les Chaises)

In a public theater show
2014 : Philippe Torreton in Cyrano de Bergerac 
 Nicolas Bouchaud in The Misanthrope
 Olivier Martin-Salvan in Pantagruel
 Stanislas Nordey in Über die Dörfer 

In a private theater show
2014 : Robert Hirsch in Le Père 
 Daniel Auteuil in Nos Femmes
 Clovis Cornillac in La Contrebasse
 Michel Fau in The Misanthrope

In a public theater show
2015 : André Dussollier in Novecento : Pianiste 
 Philippe Caubère in La Danse du diable
 Micha Lescot in Ivanov
 Olivier Martin-Salvan in Pantagruel 

In a private theater show
2015 : Maxime d'Aboville in The Servant 
 François Berléand in Deux hommes tout nus
 Claude Brasseur in La Colère du Tigre
 Nicolas Briançon in Venus in Fur

External links
 Official website 

French theatre awards
Molière